Somdet is a district (amphoe) in the northeastern part of Kalasin province, northeastern Thailand.

Geography
Neighboring districts are (from the southeast clockwise): Huai Phueng, Na Mon, Mueang Kalasin, Sahatsakhan, and Kham Muang of Kalasin Province and Phu Phan of Sakon Nakhon province.

History
The minor district (king amphoe) Somdet was created on 16 August 1964, when the three tambons Somdet, Mu Mon, and Saeng Badan were split-off from Sahatsakhan district. It was upgraded to a full district on 25 February 1969.

Administration
The district is divided into eight sub-districts (tambons), which are further subdivided into 91 villages (mubans). Somdet is a township (thesaban tambon) which covers parts of the tambon Somdet. There are a further eight tambon administrative organizations (TAO).

References

External links
amphoe.com

Somdet